David Cameron Morrell  (6 November 1929–19 March 2012) was a medical doctor, primary care pioneer and president British Medical Association (BMA). He was the first academic general practitioner to become president of the BMA.

Early life
Morrell was born on 6 November 1929 in Wimbledon, London, England. He studied at St Mary's Hospital Medical School and qualified in 1953.

Medical career
Morrell worked for five years in health service practice in Hoddesdon, Hertfordshire. In 1962 he moved to the university department of general practice in Edinburgh in West Richmond Street. In 1967 he moved to St Thomas's Hospital Medical School and was  appointed Wolfson Professor of General Practice in 1974. He authored a book, the Art of General Practice, published in 1991.

He retired from clinical practice in 1993 and was elected as BMA president in 1994.

Awards and honours
Morrell was made an Officer of the Order of the British Empire (OBE) in the 1982 Birthday Honours. He received a Papal Knighthood the same year.

He died on 19 March 2012.

References

1929 births
2012 deaths
Alumni of St Mary's Hospital Medical School
People associated with St Thomas's Hospital Medical School
20th-century English medical doctors
British general practitioners
Fellows of the Royal College of General Practitioners
Presidents of the British Medical Association